Yevgen Igorovich Tsarkov (born 14 October 1974 in Kommunarsk Lugansk oblast, Soviet Union) is a politician, Member of Verkhovna Rada of the VI сonvocation, first secretary of the Odessa oblast committee of the Communist Party of Ukraine chairman of the International Union of Komsomol Organizations - Allunion Lenin Communist Union of Youth (2009), 2005—2009 first secretary of the Central Committee of Komsomol, member of the Central Committee of the Communist Party of Ukraine (since 2005), member of the Soviet of the Union of Communist Parties – Communist Party of the Soviet Union (since 2009). Advisor of the first vicechairman of the Verkhovna Rada(2013). Secretary of the Union of Communist Parties – Communist Party of the Soviet Union (since 2014). Member of the presidium of the Central committee of the Communist Party of Ukraine (since 2014). Opponents have accused him of Ukrainaphobic statements. Thus he has claimed that "NKVD squashed nationalists insufficiently". He declares himself an opponent of capitalism, NATO, fascism and nationalism. He supports the traditional family and once initiated a legislation proposal for prohibiting the "propaganda of homosexuality".

Anti-Ukrainian sentiment in Ukraine
Odesa University alumni
People from Alchevsk
Communist Party of Ukraine politicians
Sixth convocation members of the Verkhovna Rada